The Los Esclavos Dam (Spanish: Planta Hidroeléctrica Los Esclavos) is a reinforced concrete gravity dam and power plant spanning the Los Esclavos River in the town of Los Esclavos, in Cuilapa, Escuintla, Guatemala.

Details 
The dam's reservoir has a total capacity of 225,000 m3. The water is transported to the powerhouse through a 1.33 km long channel and a 175 m long pressure pipe. The plant has  Francis turbines, with a total installed capacity of 14 MW. The plant has a net level declination of 108 m, and a designed flow of 7.68 m3/s per unit.

The plant's total power generation between 1966 and 2006 was 1,947.05 GWh, which amounts to an average annual power generation of 48.68 GWh.

See also

 List of hydroelectric power stations in Guatemala

External links

References

Hydroelectric power stations in Guatemala
Energy infrastructure completed in 1966
Dams in Guatemala
Dams completed in 1966